Jung Jin-woo (born January 17, 1938) is a South Korean film director and producer. Jung made his directorial debut with The Only Son (1963) at the age of 23, setting the Korean record for the youngest person to direct a movie. After finishing Early Rain (1966), one of the most famous teenage movies of the 1960s, he went on to direct The Ran's Elegy (1965), The Secret Meeting (1965), and The Student Boarder (1966), showcasing his superb skills as a film director.

Selected filmography

As director 
The Only Son (1963)
The Secret Meeting (1965)
The Ran's Elegy (1965)
Early Rain (1966)
The Student Boarder (1966)
Gunsmoke (1966)
The White Crow (1967)
Cloud (1968)
Woman (1968)
Frozen Spring (1970) (also credited as producer)
Oyster Village (1972) (also credited as producer)
Long Live the Island Frogs (1972) (also credited as producer)
End of an Affair  (1975)
Adultery Tree (1985) (also credited as producer)
Autumn After Love (1986)
Mugunghwa (Korean National Flower) (1995) (also credited as producer)

As producer 
Woman of Fire (1971)
Killer Butterfly (1978)

Awards 
1971 14th Buil Film Awards: Best Director (Frozen Spring)
1973 10th Blue Dragon Film Awards: Best Director (Long Live the Island Frogs)
1974 16th Buil Film Awards: Best Director (Oyster Village)
1979 18th Grand Bell Awards: Best Director (I Saw the Wild Ginseng)
1980 1st Korean Association of Film Critics Awards: Special Mention
1984 23rd Grand Bell Awards: Best Director (Adultery Tree)
1985 5th Korean Association of Film Critics Awards: Best Director (Adultery Tree)
2014 51st Grand Bell Awards: Lifetime Achievement Award for the Advancement of Cinema
2015 35th Korean Association of Film Critics Awards: Lifetime Achievement Award

References

External links 
 
 

1938 births
Living people
South Korean film producers
South Korean film directors